Chumthang Makhong (English: The Base of Rainbow) is a 2008 Indian Meitei language film directed by Romi Meitei and produced by R.K. Chandrabal under the banner of Diana Films. It stars Hamom Sadananda, Jolly Irungbam, Abenao Elangbam and Thingom Pritam in the lead roles. The film was theatrically released at Usha Cinema, Paona Bazar and many other cinema halls of Manipur in 2009 and performed well at the box office.

The film got official selection at the 7th Manipur State Film Festival 2010.

Synopsis
The love affair between Priyoranjan and Linthoi takes a disastrous turn when the former joins an insurgent group while the latter gets recruited in the police service. The game of chase and run goes on in full swing in the backdrop of a conflict torn Manipur. Priyoranjan and Linthoi's actions does not prove to be useful for both in the end.

Cast
 Hamom Sadananda as Priyoranjan
 Jolly Irungbam as Linthoi
 Abenao Elangbam as Priyo's sister
 Thingom Pritam as Rojesh
 Ahanjao as Priyo's father
 R.K. Hemabati as Linthoi's mother
 Takhellambam Lokendro as Linthoi's father
 Wangkhem Lalitkumar as Mangangkhomba
 Hemlet as Tiger
 Manihar
 Sanatombi
 Nomita
 Robert
 R.K. Mangalsana
 Tarunkumar
 Prem
 Somorendro

Soundtrack
Tomba Thangjam composed the soundtrack for the movie and Narendra Ningomba and Romi Meitei wrote the lyrics. Maibam Roshibina, Hamom Sadananda and Students of Tomba Thangjam are the playback singers. The movie has four songs.

References

Meitei-language films
2008 films
Cinema of Manipur